Deh-e Poshteh (also Romanized as Dehposhteh) is a village in Sarcheshmeh Rural District, in the Central District of Rafsanjan County, Kerman Province, Iran. At the 2006 census, its population was 11, in 5 families.

References 

Populated places in Rafsanjan County